Arnd Meißl (born 30 March 1968) is an Austrian politician who has been a Member of the Federal Council for the Freedom Party of Austria (FPÖ) from 2015 until 2017. From 2017 to 2019 he was a member of the Landtag Steiermark.

References

1968 births
Living people
Freedom Party of Austria politicians